"Dirty Deeds Done Dirt Cheap" is a hard rock song by the Australian band AC/DC. Written by group members Angus Young, Malcolm Young, and Bon Scott, it was recorded for the title track of their album Dirty Deeds Done Dirt Cheap, released in September 1976.

It was also released as a single – first in Australia in October 1976 with "R.I.P. (Rock in Peace)" as its B-side, and then in the UK in January 1977 as a maxi-single with "Big Balls" and "The Jack" as its B-sides. Once the Dirty Deeds album was finally released in the US in 1981 the "Dirty Deeds..." single was released there (backed by "Highway To Hell"), where it reached number four on the then-new Top Tracks chart.

The song ranked No. 24 on VH1's 40 Greatest Metal Songs and in 2009 it was named the 31st best hard rock song of all time also by VH1.

It features a backing vocal consisting of a heavy breathing sound, made on the downbeat during verses. It also features the title in a spoken-word style at the end of the chorus; plus a scream at the end of the song. The full-length recording (approximately 4:11) has the title of the song chanted four times starting at 3:09, but on the more common edited version (approximately 3:51) the chant is heard only twice.

Composition

The song's narrator, a hitman, invites people experiencing problems to either call his phone number or visit him at his home, at which point he will perform assorted unsavoury and violent acts to resolve said problems. Situations in which he offers assistance include those involving lewd high school headmasters and significant others who are either adulterous or who persistently find fault with their partners. As detailed by the song, the "dirty deeds" performed at low cost include:

 Concrete shoes
 Cyanide
 TNT
 Neckties
 Contracts
 High Voltage

Two of the services offered share names with AC/DC's first two Australian albums, T.N.T. and High Voltage. They are also the names of songs that appeared on Australia's T.N.T. and the international version of High Voltage.

The song is written in E Minor.

Influences
The phrase "Dirty Deeds Done Dirt Cheap" is an homage to the cartoon Beany and Cecil, which Angus Young watched when he was a child. One of the cartoon's characters was named Dishonest John, who carried a business card that read: "Dirty Deeds Done Dirt Cheap. Holidays, Sundays, and Special Rates." “It was Angus that came up with the song title…" Malcolm Young told Mark Blake. "It was based on a cartoon character that had the phrase as his calling card.

Controversy
In 1981, Norman and Marilyn White of Libertyville, Illinois filed a $250,000 lawsuit in Lake County, Illinois Circuit Court against Atlantic Records and its distributors because, they alleged, their telephone number was included in the song, resulting in hundreds of prank phone calls.  Their attorney told the Chicago Tribune that the song's 36-24-36 digits were followed by a "hey!", which to his clients sounded like an "8", thus creating the couple's phone number.

Chart history

Certifications

Personnel
Bon Scott – lead vocals
Angus Young – lead guitar
Malcolm Young – rhythm guitar, backing vocals
Mark Evans – bass guitar
Phil Rudd – drums
Producers: Harry Vanda, George Young

Live recordings

"Dirty Deeds Done Dirt Cheap" has only been included on one official AC/DC live album, 1992's Live, sung by Scott's replacement Brian Johnson. This live version was released as a single. A video clip for the single was released containing footage from the Live at Donington home video, as well as other old clips mixed in the video. This video clip was later released on the DVD Family Jewels Disc 3, as part of the 2009 box set Backtracks.

An earlier version with Bon Scott, recorded live in Sydney (Haymarket) at the Festival of Sydney on  1977, was released on an Australian only radio 2JJ compilation album titled Long Live The Evolution. This live version was later released on Backtracks.

In 2007 on the Plug Me In three track bonus CD from Best Buy, a live version from Detroit, Michigan, (Joe Louis Arena) 17 or  1983 was released.

Joan Jett cover

American singer-songwriter Joan Jett recorded the song, shortening the title to "Dirty Deeds," and included it on her LP, The Hit List, in late 1990. It was released as a single and charted internationally.

Charts

In popular culture 
The title of the song is referenced in the Japanese manga JoJo's Bizarre Adventure: Steel Ball Run, written by Hirohiko Araki. The primary antagonist of the part, President Funny Valentine, wields a Stand named "Dirty Deeds Done Dirt Cheap". It is often referred to simply by the sobriquet "D4C".

References

External links
 Lyrics of this song
AC/DC's official website
 
 

AC/DC songs
Songs written by Angus Young
Songs written by Bon Scott
Songs written by Malcolm Young
1976 singles
1990 singles
Joan Jett songs
Song recordings produced by Harry Vanda
Song recordings produced by George Young (rock musician)
1976 songs
Albert Productions singles
Atco Records singles
Chrysalis Records singles
Music controversies
Songs about domestic violence